The Morassutti family is an Italian family, originally from Friuli Venezia Giula, that has been active in the wholesaler and retail hardware trade since the early nineteenth century. They are mostly known for having started one of the few distribution chain of hardware and household articles during the thirties of the twentieth century.

Overview 
The Morassutti family, active first in the trade of hardware and wood, then in the field of household objects constituted in Italy during the 20th century an innovative sales systems: both with the use of catalogs and service to the retailer as well as by proposing modern techniques of self-service and atypical franchising. The Paolo Morassutti company became a point of reference for the Italian hardware market and it retraced the growth hubs already experienced by the American wholesale trade. Their commercial strategy was characterized by product specialization, differentation in pricing policies according to the different geographical areas of Italy, retail stores chain and by transferring know-how of sales and management to retail customers, such as the use of stock management as well as a propensity for innovative marketing.

Federico Morassutti 
 (22 October 1876 - 17 April 1954) was an Italian entrepreneur and philanthropist, a prominent member of the Morassutti family mostly known for his farsighted entrepreneurial choice of creating a network of shops, a veritable supply chain of long-lived consumer goods. In 1886, at the age of ten, Federico was sent to a boarding school in Cremona, and from there abroad, to Grenoble and Ljubljana, to perfect his education and gain experience in trade-related matters. During that time the family company was experiencing a period of uncertainty. In 1898, at the death of his father, the management of the company passed to Federico, twenty-two years old at that time, who initially devoted himself to consolidating the financial situation in order to grow by expanding from regional borders and by launching the company into the national market. The "Great War" considerably reduce the company's commercial activity, particularly in the retail sector but during the post-war years it was relaunched. New deposits were opened, first in Bologna and later in Naples placing the company at the forefront of the national panorama of the distribution sector. In 1922 The  Paolo Morassutti  was transformed into a collective company formed by Federico as the managing director and by his brothers Giovanni Paolo, Domenico and Antonio. From there to a few years, however, in conjunction with the general crisis of the thirties,  different views emerge between the brothers. In the late thirties the company was booming and at the beginning of the fifties the company employed more than 500 employees, located in 21 stores. In 1952 the company itself changed its structure becoming a modern joint-stock company. During The Fifties, The Paolo Morassutti company, with a capital of 210 million lire, employed about 570 employees located in 24 settlements (20 stores and 4 depots) spread throughout the country: from Veneto to Lazio, from Liguria to Emilia, from Lombardy to Campania. Federico  Morassutti died in Padua in the spring of 1954 after establishing his family business among the leading companies in the wholesaler distribution sector of Italy during the second half of the 20th century.

Archive 

The Paolo Morassutti company archive has been missing after its absorption by La Rinascente group in the seventies of the twentieth century.

Notable family members 

  (8 December 1920 – 4 September 2008), Italian architect. In 1949 Bruno Morassutti, son of Federico, attended the Taliesin Fellowship studying with American architect Frank Lloyd Wright, then moved to Milan to begin a partnership with Italian architect Angelo Mangiarotti realizing notable work like (1959-1962) among others.
 Paolo Morassutti (19 April 1927 – 9 August 2013), Italian entrepreneur. Paolo Morassutti, son of Federico, brought in Padua the German company Fischer by signing an agreement in 1963 with its owner Artur Fischer. The commercial agreement was maintained until 2000.

References

Bibliography 

 Roverato, Giorgio (1993). Una famiglia e un caso imprenditoriale : I Morassutti (In Italian).4. Neri Pozza. 

Italian families